Blind is a 2007 Dutch drama film written and directed by Tamar van den Dop, and starring Joren Seldeslachts, Halina Reijn and Katelijne Verbeke. The film follows a story of a loving couple, an albino woman and a blind man.

Plot 
Ruben (Joren Seldeslachts) is a lone and unbalanced young man who lost his sight in childhood. Marie (Halina Reijn) is an albino woman of temperate look and with a lot of insecurities. She has a beautiful voice and along with Ruben shares a mutual love for books and tales. Ruben's mother hires her as a reader to read her son books orally. While they live in a mansion, between these two lonely souls sparks love, but will love still be blind if the man recovers from his blindness?

Cast 
 Joren Seldeslachts plays Ruben Rietlander, a main protagonist character who had lost his sight in childhood.
 Halina Reijn plays Marie, a main protagonist character that falls in love with Ruben.
 Katelijne Verbeke plays Catherine Rietlander, Ruben's mother.
 Jan Decleir plays Dr. Victor Verbeecke.
 Annemieke Bakker plays Romy.

Production 
Production took place in the year 2007 with a budget of 3 million euro, and the script was written by Tamar van den Dop who also directed the movie. Other companies and people involved in production of this movie include: Cinenumerique - sound re-recording, Film Finances - completion guarantor, Herrie - unit publicity, Kemna Casting - casting, Warnier Studio Amsterdam - dolby mastering, sound post-production, Valkieser Capital Images - special effects.

Reception 
Blind was screened at the Toronto International Film Festival and was received positively. Film critics who reviewed other films which had featured on Toronto International Film Festival gave it positive scores. As Radheyan Simonpillai, a film critic from web based version of Now magazine, noted that a scene "where two hands fondle through a milky white veil is about as sensual as they come". Another critic David Nusair of Reel Film Reviews gave it 3 stars out of 4.

References

External links 
 
 
 

2007 films
2007 romantic drama films
Albinism in popular culture
Belgian romantic drama films
Bulgarian drama films
Dutch romantic drama films
2000s Dutch-language films
Films scored by Junkie XL
Films about blind people
Films shot in Antwerp
Films shot in Bulgaria
Films shot in the Netherlands
Films about disability